The War Cross for Civil Merits was a civil award of Austria-Hungary.  Established on 16 August 1915 by Emperor Franz Joseph I of Austria, it recognized civilian war service during World War I.  The cross could also be awarded to military officers for their contributions to the war but were not directly involved in combat operations.

Appearance
The War Cross for Civil Merits is in the shape of a Cross pattée, 55 mm high and 55 mm across.  A laurel wreath surrounds the center medallion, passing under the horizontal arms of the cross, and in front of the vertical arms.  The first and second Class crosses are gilded, the third class is silver, and the fourth class is bronze.  The first through third classes had white enamel on the arms of the cross.  The center medallion, also enameled white, bears the Emperor's monogram FJI (Franz Joseph Imperator), surrounding the letters is the inscription "Merito Civili tempore belli MCMXV" (Civil merit in time of war 1915).  The cross was worn as a breast cross directly on the coat or uniform.

References

Orders, decorations, and medals of Austria-Hungary
Military awards and decorations of Austria-Hungary
Awards established in 1915
1915 establishments in Austria-Hungary
Military awards and decorations of World War I
Awards disestablished in 1918